Mergozzo is a comune (municipality) in the Province of Verbano-Cusio-Ossola in the Italian region Piedmont, located about  northeast of Turin and about  northwest of Verbania.

Mergozzo borders the following municipalities: Gravellona Toce, Ornavasso, Premosello-Chiovenda, San Bernardino Verbano, Verbania.

Economy
Tourism based on the attractions of Lake Mergozzo, nearly all of which falls within the territory of the comune, forms the principal basis of the local economy. Next in importance is the quarrying and working of stone. The pink marble of Candoglia, which was employed in building the Duomo di Milano from the 14th  century on, is still extracted; the stone of Montorfano is exported throughout the world.

The agricultural sector is also active.

Sport 
In the area of the village Nibbio, in the municipality of Mergozzo there is a rock climbing area called La Panoramica.

Notes

External links

Cities and towns in Piedmont